This is a complete list of appearances by members of the professional playing squad of UE Lleida during the 1990–91 season.

1991
Lleida
Lleida
Lleida